Yakovlevka is a rural locality (a village) in Adzitarovsky Selsoviet, Karmaskalinsky District, Bashkortostan, Russia. The population was 3 as of 2010. There is 1 street.

Geography 
Yakovlevka is located 55 km southwest of Karmaskaly (the district's administrative centre) by road. Chishma is the nearest rural locality.

References 

Rural localities in Karmaskalinsky District